Junior Jones (born December 20, 1970) is an American former professional boxer who competed from 1989 to 2002. He is a two-weight world champion, having held the WBA bantamweight title from 1993 to 1994, and the WBO super bantamweight title from 1996 to 1997. Additionally he held the IBO featherweight title from 1999 to 2000.

Amateur career
As an amateur, Jones won the New York Golden Gloves tournament twice.

Professional career

Jones made his professional debut on June 8, 1989, scoring a first-round technical knockout against George Young. A further 31 consecutive victories followed, during which Jones defeated Jorge Eliécer Julio to win the WBA bantamweight title on October 23, 1993. Jones made one successful defense, but lost his title after being stopped in eleven rounds by John Michael Johnson on April 22, 1994; they had previously fought on August 10, 1989, with Jones winning by unanimous decision (UD). More than two years later, on November 22, 1996, Jones scored his most significant victory by handing then-undefeated Marco Antonio Barrera his first loss to win the WBO super bantamweight title, thus becoming a two-weight world champion. A minor controversy arose at the end of their fight when Barrera's cornermen entered the ring after he had been knocked down in the fifth round, which forced the referee to disqualify Barrera rather than award a stoppage to Jones. In their rematch, which took place on April 18, 1997, Jones won a close UD to defend his title.

On December 19, 1997, Jones lost the title after being stopped in four rounds by 1988 Olympic gold medalist Kennedy McKinney. In his next fight, on September 12, 1998, Jones was again stopped in the fourth round, this time by WBC super bantamweight champion Érik Morales. On April 10, 1999, Jones won the vacant IBO featherweight title with a late stoppage of Richard Evatt in the eleventh round. In his first defense, on April 29, 2000, he lost the title to IBF featherweight champion Paul Ingle in yet another eleventh-round stoppage. Jones' final fight, on December 6, 2002, was a ten-round UD loss to Ivan Alvarez.

Professional boxing record

References

External links

1970 births
Living people
Sportspeople from Brooklyn
Boxers from New York City
Bantamweight boxers
Super-bantamweight boxers
World boxing champions
World bantamweight boxing champions
World super-bantamweight boxing champions
World Boxing Association champions
World Boxing Organization champions
International Boxing Organization champions
American male boxers
Featherweight boxers
Super-featherweight boxers